Gary James Collins (born August 20, 1940) is a former American football wide receiver and punter who played for the Cleveland Browns from 1962 to 1971.

Early life
Born in Williamstown, Pennsylvania, Collins attended Williamstown High School and was recruited by the University of Maryland. During his three seasons (1959–61) with the Terrapins, he established a number of school records, and left his mark on the Atlantic Coast Conference record book as well. In 1961, he finished eighth in the Heisman Trophy balloting.

NFL career
The Browns chose Collins with the fourth draft pick in the 1962 NFL Draft and immediately made him the starting punter, while also using him as a reserve for veteran receiver Ray Renfro. In 1963, he moved into the starting lineup and led the team with 43 receptions and teamed with quarterback Frank Ryan to pace the league with 13 touchdowns catches. The latter mark broke a team record of nine, established by Dante Lavelli in 1947.

The following year, rookie Paul Warfield became Ryan's top receiver, but Collins developed a knack for coming through in the clutch. The first instance came in the season's second game, when he caught a fourth-down pass from Ryan to set up a go-ahead touchdown against the St. Louis Cardinals. Saving the best for last, Collins sparkled in the 1964 NFL championship game, when he was on the receiving end of three touchdown passes from Ryan and won the game's Most Valuable Player award in the 27–0 upset over the Baltimore Colts.

Building on the spectacular ending to that season, Collins followed with two more excellent campaigns in which he caught more than 50 passes and again finished in double digits in touchdown receptions. In 1965, he led the Browns with 50 receptions for 884 yards, and his average of 46.7 yards per punt topped the NFL. His 56 catches for 946 yards again led the team in 1966.

In 1967, Collins saw his numbers for both receiving and punting drop, but he made his second straight Pro Bowl appearance. The following year, Collins gave up his punting duties, but suffered a severe shoulder injury in the October 5 game against the Pittsburgh Steelers. The injury kept him out of action until the final week of the regular season and limited him to just nine receptions. While he made the most of those catches by averaging over 25 yards per grab, Collins caught no touchdown passes for the only time in his career.

Collins bounced back in 1969 with 54 catches and 11 touchdown receptions and helped the Browns reach the NFL Championship game for the fourth time in six seasons. In 1970, the punishing life of an NFL receiver began to catch up with him as he suffered from a number of rib injuries that limited him to 26 catches. In the team's December 12 game against the Dallas Cowboys, played in a driving rainstorm which turned the Cleveland Stadium surface into mud, a costly fumble by Collins after being hit in the ribs stopped a key drive and played a role in the team's 6–2 loss, a defeat that helped keep the team out of the postseason.

The ascension of new head coach Nick Skorich in 1971 would eventually develop into a personality conflict between Collins and the new mentor. After just 15 receptions that year, Collins announced during the offseason that he would retire unless he was traded to either the Washington Redskins or New York Jets.

Post-NFL career
When neither team was able to work out a deal, Collins retired and took an assistant coaching position with Lebanon Valley College in Annville, Pennsylvania.  He signed as a player-coach with the WFL's Florida Blazers in 1974, but sustained a broken collarbone in preseason and saw only limited action later in the season, recording 3 catches.  After then leaving football altogether, he worked as an insurance agent in Hershey, Pennsylvania, and did some broadcasting. Married in 1980, Collins has two children and six grandchildren.

Legacy
Collins retired with 339 receptions for 5,299 yards and 70 touchdowns. He remains the Browns' leader in career receiving touchdowns, and his reception total ranks second behind that of Ozzie Newsome. As a punter, he averaged 41.0 yards per attempt.

Those numbers have led some of Collins' supporters to launch a quiet campaign for election to the Pro Football Hall of Fame, citing the similarities between Collins' career numbers and those of Pittsburgh Steelers wideout Lynn Swann.

Gary Collins is a member of The Pigskin Club Of Washington, D.C. National Collegiate All-American Football Players Honor Roll.

In 2016, the Professional Football Researchers Association named Collins to the PRFA Hall of Very Good Class of 2016

References

Other sources 
 Grossi, Tony (2004). Tales from the Browns Sideline. (Champaign, Ill.): Sports Publishing LLC. 
 Stewart, Todd, ed. (2004) Cleveland Browns 2004 Media Guide. New York: National Communications Group.
 Carroll, Bob, et al. (1999) Total Football II. New York: HarperCollins. .

1940 births
Living people
All-American college football players
American football wide receivers
American football punters
Florida Blazers players
Maryland Terrapins football players
Cleveland Browns players
Eastern Conference Pro Bowl players
People from Dauphin County, Pennsylvania
Players of American football from Pennsylvania